Dorothy Hansine Andersen (May 15, 1901 – March 3, 1963) was an American physician, pediatrician,  and pathologist who was the first person to identify cystic fibrosis, the first to describe the disease, and the one to name it. in 1939, she was awarded the E. Mead Johnson Award for her identification of the disease. In 2002, she was inducted into the National Women's Hall of Fame.

Early life 
Dorothy Hansine Andersen was born in Asheville, North Carolina, on May 15, 1901. Her father, Hans Peter Andersen, died in 1914. She then assumed the full responsibility for caring for her invalid mother. After they had moved to St. Johnsbury, Vermont, Andersen's mother died in 1920.

Education and initial career 
In 1922, Andersen was graduated with a bachelor of arts degree in zoology and chemistry from Mount Holyoke College. Later, she went on to attend Johns Hopkins School of Medicine where she first began to perform research under Florence Rena Sabin. Andersen's first two research papers were on the lymphatic and blood vessels in the reproductive organs of female pigs. Both of these papers were published in Contributions to Embryology.

Upon graduation from Johns Hopkins School of Medicine, Andersen served as a teaching assistant in anatomy at the Rochester School of Medicine. A year later she became an intern for surgery at the Strong Memorial Hospital in Rochester, New York. After completing her internship year, Andersen was denied a residency in general surgery at the hospital because of her gender. The denial drove Andersen to focus upon research. 

In 1929, she began working at Columbia University's College of Physician and Surgeons as an assistant in pathology. Later, she was asked to join the faculty as an instructor at Columbia Medical School. 

In order to further a research career, Andersen began to work on her doctorate degree in medical science by studying endocrinology at Columbia University. Specifically, she studied the influences of the endocrine glands on the onset and rate of sexual maturation in rats. By 1935, she received a doctorate from Columbia University.

Focus on pathology 
She then became a pathologist at Babies Hospital at the Columbia Presbyterian Medical Center. This is where Andersen remained for the rest of her medical career. In 1945, Andersen was given the title of an assistant pediatrician at Babies Hospital. 

Because of her knowledge of anatomy, she was called to become a consultant to the Armed Forces Institute of Pathology during World War II. In 1952, she became the chief of pathology at Babies Hospital. Later that year, Dorothy Hansine Andersen was awarded the Elizabeth Blackwell Award.

Research career 
During her research career, Dorothy Hansine Andersen studied many children who had digestive or breathing problems, performing autopsies on those who died from these problems. While performing the autopsies she noticed many of the patients who had died from celiac disease had fluid-filled cysts that were surrounded by scars on the pancreas. She also found similar scars and tissue damage in the lungs. These factors led her to the conclusion that the lung and pancreas damage came from the same disease that she called "cystic fibrosis of the pancreas". The name cystic describes to the cysts found the fibrosis describes the scar tissue in the lungs and pancreas. Her research was published in the American Journal of Diseases of Children in 1938. She was awarded the E. Mead Johnson Award in 1939 for her recognition of this disease. 

In 1942 at Babies Hospital, Andersen developed the first efficient diagnostic test for cystic fibrosis with Paul di Sant'Agnese, who also worked at Columbia University. In 1948, The American Academy of Pediatrics awarded the Borden Bronze Plaque to Anderson for her successful research in nutrition that was entitled “Determining the effectiveness of different antibiotics in relieving the respiratory-tract infections that were the main cause of death from cystic fibrosis.” 

By 1958, Andersen was a full-time professor at the Columbia College of Physicians and Surgeons. During this time in her career, Andersen wrote in the Journal of Chronic Diseases that her research findings corresponded to cystic fibrosis, a recessively inherited disease that had been thought to be fatal in early infancy, however, she now found that many patients were surviving until early adulthood. Andersen published her final paper in 1959 on the reoccurrence of cystic fibrosis in young adults. 

Researchers could not determine the cause of cystic fibrosis until the early 1980s, At that time it was confirmed that a single mutation was the cause of the incomplete synthesis of a transmembrane protein that results in thick, clogging secretions mainly in the pancreas and respiratory tract.

In addition to her research on cystic fibrosis, Dorothy Hansine Andersen also initially investigated and described a rare glycogen storage disease, glycogen storage disease type IV (GSD IV) also known as Andersen's disease. It is caused by a lack of activity in glycogen-branching enzyme, resulting in accumulation of glycogen in the liver. This disease is inherited in an autosomal recessive manner and the first symptoms begin appearing during a child's first few months of life. Usually, this disease is fatal within the first few years of life.

Personal life 
Anderson was well-liked as a professor. She had a reserved personality. Although often characterized as supposedly "unladylike", Dorothy Hansine Andersen enjoyed an active lifestyle that included hiking, canoeing, and carpentry. She was defended following such criticism by the supporters of her talent and contributions to the professional field of medicine. 

Toward the end of her career, Andersen had developed lung cancer and she underwent surgery in 1962. Dorothy Hansine Andersen died at the age of sixty-one on March 3, 1963, in New York, New York.

Posthumous awards 
After her death in 1963, her work garnered further recognition. She was honored with the Distinguished Service Medal at the Columbia Presbyterian Medical Center. In remembrance for her work on cystic fibrosis, Dorothy Hansine Andersen was inducted into the National Women's Hall of Fame in 2002.

See also
 Andersen's disease

References

Further reading

External links
Changing Face of Medicine Biography
Lost Women of Science, Episode 3: The Case of the Missing Portrait of Dorothy Hansine Andersen by Katie Hafner in Scientific American

1901 births
1963 deaths
American medical researchers
Johns Hopkins University alumni
Mount Holyoke College alumni
Cystic fibrosis
Women medical researchers
Columbia Medical School faculty
University of Rochester faculty
20th-century American women scientists
20th-century American scientists
American pulmonologists
20th-century American physicians
Physicians from New York City
20th-century American women physicians
Scientists from New York (state)
Deaths from lung cancer in New York (state)
American women academics
American people of Danish descent